East Meets West (東成西就2011) is a 2011 Hong Kong comedy film directed by Jeffrey Lau.

Cast
 Kenny Bee
 Eason Chan
 Ekin Cheng
 Karen Mok
 Stephy Tang
 William So
 Tan Weiwei
 Jaycee Chan
 Huang Yi
 Tiffany Tang
 Yang Mi
 William Chan
 Alan Tam
 Benette Pang
 Anthony Chan

See also
 The Eagle Shooting Heroes

References

External links
 

2011 films
2010s Cantonese-language films
Hong Kong comedy films
2011 comedy films
Films directed by Jeffrey Lau
2010s Hong Kong films